Second-seeded pair Mark Edmondson and Sherwood Stewart won the title, sharing $18,000 prize money after beating Carlos Kirmayr and Cássio Motta in the final.

Seeds
The top four seeds received a bye into the second round. A champion seed is indicated in bold text while text in italics indicates the round in which that seed was eliminated.

Draw

Finals

Top half

Bottom half

References

External links

1983 Grand Prix (tennis)
Men's Doubles